Hume Dam, formerly the Hume Weir, is a major dam across the Murray River downstream of its junction with the Mitta River in the Riverina region of New South Wales, Australia. The dam's purpose includes flood mitigation, hydro-power, irrigation, water supply and conservation. The impounded reservoir is called Lake Hume, formerly the Hume Reservoir. It is a gated concrete gravity dam with four earth embankments and twenty-nine vertical undershot gated concrete overflow spillways.

Location
The dam was built, involving a workforce of thousands, by a consortium of NSW and Victorian government agencies that included the Water Resources Commission of New South Wales, the Public Works Department of New South Wales, and the State Rivers and Water Supply Commission of Victoria. Supplies to the construction site were delivered via rail, through the construction of a branch siding from the Wodonga – Cudgewa railway. Hume Dam is jointly managed by Victorian and New South Wales authorities on behalf of the Murray-Darling Basin Authority. Goulburn-Murray Water manages water and land located in Victoria, and the New South Wales State Water Corporation is responsible for day-to-day operation and maintenance and the management of major remedial works at the dam.

Description
The dam is a mix of a concrete gravity dam with four earth embankments. The dam wall is constructed of rock covered with clay and other earth and is designed to carry vehicular traffic. A controlled concrete spillway that comprises a gated concrete overflow, with twenty-nine vertical undershot gates, is capable of discharging .

Monitoring of the dam in the early 1990s revealed that the water pressure and leakage had caused the dam to move on its foundations slightly, leading to concerns that the dam was heading for collapse, threatening Albury-Wodonga and the entire Murray basin. Authorities denied any short-term threat. Traffic was banned from the spillway, and remedial work commenced involving, in part, the construction of a secondary earth wall behind the original to take the strain. Further upgrades to the dam at an estimated cost of A$60 million commenced in 2007 and were completed in 2013. These works include the installation of an improved filter and drainage system on the junction between the concrete spillway and southern embankment, construction of a concrete buttress on the southern training wall, and possible modifications to improve the ability of the dam to manage extreme floods.

Power station

The Hume Power Station is a  hydro-electric power station installed in the dam wall, and is primarily used for peak-load generation. The power station comprises two  turbines and is operated by Meridian Energy. In October 2012, a high voltage transformer at the power station caught fire, requiring more than fifty fire fighters who worked into the long hours of the night to put the blaze out.

The power station was completed in 1957, running two  turbines.

Etymology
Originally named the Mitta Mitta Dam site, following representations from the Municipal Council of Albury, on 17 February 1920 the River Murray Commission decided to honour Hamilton Hume, who, in company with William Hovell, was one of the first Europeans to see and cross the Murray River in 1824. In 1920, the reservoir was named the Hume Reservoir and the dam adopted the name of the Hume Weir, the name given by the Victorian Place Names Committee. Following a proposal from Hume Shire Council, in 1996 both the NSW and Victorian governments agreed that the dam should be named the Hume Dam, and the reservoir be named Lake Hume.

Lake Hume

Lake Hume is estimated to hold approximately six times the volume of water in Sydney Harbour. The small towns of Tallangatta, Bonegilla and Bellbridge are located on the shores of Lake Hume. The reservoir is often referred to as the Hume Weir, only named Lake Hume in the mid-1980s.

Reservoir levels
Lake Hume was the furthest upstream of the major reservoirs on the Murray River system, but Dartmouth Dam was built further up Mitta Mitta River to provide improved buffering across prolonged dry years. Hume has the capacity to release water at the fastest rate. Irrigation authorities used the reservoir as the storage of first resort. The reservoir typically falls to less than one-third capacity by March each year, but in normal years refills to at least two-thirds capacity before November, though Australia's highly unpredictable climatic conditions cause these figures to vary quite significantly from year to year. In 2007 Lake Hume fell to 1% capacity, barely more than the water in the Murray and Mitta Mitta rivers flowing through on their original paths.

Recreation
The lake is stocked with fish. Most of these are introduced species – carp, redfin and trout though native species such as Golden Perch and Murray Cod can also be found. The fishing varies from year to year. It is also popular for water skiing, and several holiday resorts catering for fishing and skiers are dotted around the upper reaches of the lake. An annual Canoe marathon race the 'Frank Harrison Classic'  is run on the river beginning below the dam each February and attracts competitors from across Australia.

Impact on the ecology of the Murray River
The construction of Hume Dam has caused significant changes to the flow patterns and ecology of the Murray River. Before the construction of the Hume Weir, flows in normal (non-drought) years were low in summer and autumn (though still significant overall), rising in winter due to seasonal rainfall and reaching a flood-peak in late spring due to snow-melt in the Murray and its tributaries' alpine headwaters. The flow is now effectively reversed, with low flows in winter and sustained, relatively high flows in late spring, summer and early autumn to meet irrigation demands, although the spring flood peak has been virtually eliminated. The water released from the base of the Hume Weir is unnaturally cold, at least 10 °C (18 °F) colder than it naturally should be. This flow reversal, temperature depression, and removal of the spring flood peak, has led to the drying out and loss of many billabongs and has harmed the populations of native fish of the Murray River such as the iconic Murray Cod and the freshwater catfish, which can no longer be found downstream of the dam as far as Yarrawonga, where it had previously been recorded up until the 1960s.

Engineering heritage 
The dam is part of the Engineering Works of the River Murray that are listed as a National Engineering Landmark by Engineers Australia as part of its Engineering Heritage Recognition Program.

Hume Weir Football Club
The Hume Weir FC was established in 1921, mainly from footballers working on the construction of the new weir and the club initially played in the Albury & Border Football Association from 1921 to 1923, wearing black and white striped jumpers. Andrew Mafferzoni was the club's initial coach in 1921 and they played at the "Weir Ground". Hume Weir won the Albury & Border FA premiership in 1922 and 1923.

In 1924, Hume Weir joined the Ovens and Murray Football League (O&MFL) and played there until 1929, with Percy Jones kicking 104 goals for Hume Weir in 1928 before being lured to Geelong in 1929. As part of being admitted into the O&MFL in 1924, Hume Weir agreed to play their home games at the Wodonga Racecourse Oval. Hume Weir were runners up to Wangaratta in 1925 and were coached by Tim Archer. In 1927, Hume Weir played their home games at Wodonga Park.

In 1930 Hume Weir merged with Ebden Rovers Football Club to become the Weir United Football Club. Weir United went onto win the 1930 and 1931 O&MFL premierships.

In 1933 East Albury Football Club and Weir United Football Club merged to become the Border United Football Club (Albury based) and wore green and white jumpers and lost the 1933 O&MFL grand final to Wangaratta and also lost the 1935 O&MFL grand final to Rutherglen.

Then in 1936, Border United FC (Albury based) would merge with the Albury Football Club and be known as Albury FC.

Albury FC then played in the 1937, 1939 and 1940 O&MFL grand finals. Then, immediately after the World War II recess, Albury played in the 1946, 1947 and 1948 O&MFL grand finals.

Gallery

See also

 Hume Weir Motor Racing Circuit
 Irrigation in Australia
 List of dams and reservoirs in New South Wales

References

External links

 
 
 
  
 
1928 – Hume Weir FC & Benalla FC team photos
1930 – O&MFL Premiers: Weir United FC & West Albury grand final team photos
1931 – O&MFL Premiers: Weir United FC team photo
1933 – Border United FC & Wangaratta FC O&MFL team photos

Dams in New South Wales
Dams in Victoria (Australia)
North-East catchment
Rivers of Hume (region)
Crossings of the Murray River
Gravity dams
Dams in the Murray River basin
Energy infrastructure completed in 1957
Hydroelectric power stations in New South Wales
Recipients of Engineers Australia engineering heritage markers